Hypoptopoma spectabile is a species of armoured catfish native to the Amazon and Orinoco river basins in Colombia, Ecuador, Peru and Venezuela. This species grows to a length of  SL.

References

Hypoptopomatini
Fish of South America
Taxa named by Carl H. Eigenmann
Fish described in 1914